The 2013–14 Oregon Ducks women's basketball team represented the University of Oregon during the 2013–14 NCAA Division I women's basketball season. The Ducks, led by fifth year head coach Paul Westhead, played their games at the Matthew Knight Arena and were members of the Pac-12 Conference. They finished with a record of 16–16 overall, 6–12 in Pac-12 play for a tie for a ninth-place finish. They lost in the first round of the 2014 Pac-12 Conference women's basketball tournament to Washington State. They were invited to the 2014 Women's National Invitation Tournament which they defeated Pacific in the first round before losing to Washington in the second round.

Roster

Schedule

|-
!colspan=9 | Regular Season

|-
!colspan=9| 2014 Pac-12 Tournament

|-
!colspan=9 | WNIT

See also
2013–14 Oregon Ducks men's basketball team

References

Oregon Ducks women's basketball seasons
Oregon
2014 Women's National Invitation Tournament participants
Oregon Ducks
Oregon Ducks